Graham "Spider" Webb (born 19 April 1936) is a prominent Australian radio and TV broadcaster and producer.

Biography
Graham Webb began his radio career at 2TM Tamworth in 1954. In 1955, he moved to Brisbane, to become the "junior" announcer for 4BH, before moving on to 4GY Gympie, to gain more experience.

After a stint in National Service, Graham returned to Sydney in 1957, where he became the announcer for the Sunday religious programs on 2CH. Subsequently, Graham became Reg Grundy's offsider on the radio version of "Wheel Of Fortune".

In late 1957, Graham joined radio 2UE, where he hosted the first Top 40 radio show on Sydney radio in the late 1950s, working with Gary O'Callaghan, John Laws, Tony Withers and Bob Rogers. This was followed by a brief move to 4KQ in Brisbane in 1960, then back to Sydney to host 2GB breakfast in 1961.

In 1964, Graham headed for Europe, where he worked at several radio stations, including Deutsche Welle "The Voice Of Germany". He eventually moved to the United Kingdom during the mid 1960s, where he, along with several other Australian DJs, became prominent in the flourishing pirate radio scene.

Graham joined Radio Caroline in 1965, going on to become Programme Controller and later, News Director. He was one of the staff rescued from Mi Amigo, when she ran aground at Frinton in January, 1966. He left Radio Caroline and returned to Australia, before the proclamation of the Marine Broadcasting Offences Act 1967, which forced the closure of pirate radio stations.

In the late '60s, Graham presented the Australian end of the long running "Family Favourites" radio series on BBC/ABC. At the same time, he hosted several TV shows, including Blind Date, which ran between 1967 and 1974, and Jeopardy in the early '70s.

In 1974, Graham hosted and produced the pioneering Saturday morning music video series Sounds Unlimited – the world’s first program to feature pop video clips, a forerunner to MTV. As the producer of Sounds Unlimited, Graham played a pivotal role in the career of video and feature film director Russell Mulcahy. In need of material for the new show, Graham approached Mulcahy, who was a staffer in the ATN-7 newsroom, and asked him to film some footage to accompany popular songs, for which there were no purpose-made clips (e.g. Kris Kristofferson's "Why Me" and Harry Nilsson's "Everybody's Talking"). Using this method, Webb and Mulcahy assembled a collection of around 25 clips for the first show. The success of his early efforts encouraged Mulcahy to quit his TV job to become a full-time director. He made clips for popular Australian acts including Stylus, Marcia Hines, Hush and AC/DC, before moving to the UK, where he became one of the most successful music video directors of the 1980s and beyond.

While TV took Graham's time, he always had a hand in radio throughout the 1970s and 1980s, working at several stations, including 2GB and 2UW in Sydney. In the early 1990s, Graham relocated to the Gold Coast, Queensland, where he was heard on Gold FM and the ABC.

After his wife, Tina, died from cancer in 1995, Graham and his two sons relocated to the Sunshine Coast, Queensland, where in 1999, he co-founded Sunshine FM – a radio station targeting seniors, which went to air in 2000. For many years, until recently, he was the breakfast host on the station.

Presently, Graham hosts a program called "Webby's Golden Years Of Radio" - an audio book of his life behind the microphone. It is a weekly 2 hour program, syndicated to many community and narrowcast stations around Australia.

About the program, Graham states:
"Along with the amazing music from the past 6 decades, I am including personal interviews with stars such as The Beatles, Monkees, ABBA and many others, especially our own Aussie stars. I'm also including entertaining 'grabs' from radio shows of the past from my personal collection."

Graham also currently presents regular shifts on Harmony FM in Richmond, NSW.

References

1936 births
Living people
Australian radio presenters
Australian game show hosts
Offshore radio broadcasters
Pirate radio personalities